Philippine jade Culture or Jade Artifacts, made from white and green nephrite and dating as far back as 2000–1500 BC, have been discovered at a number of archeological excavations in the Philippines since the 1930s. The artifacts have been both tools like chisels, and ornaments such as lingling-o earrings, bracelets and beads.

The green nephrite has been traced to a deposit near the modern Hualien City in eastern Taiwan. The source of the white nephrite is unknown. The jade was worked in the Philippines, especially in Batanes, Luzon, and Palawan. Some was also processed in Vietnam, while the peoples of Malaysia, Brunei, Singapore, Thailand, Indonesia, and Cambodia also participated in one of the most extensive sea-based trade networks of a single geological material in the prehistoric world. It was in existence for at least 3,000 years, where its peak production was from 2000 BC to 500 AD, older than the Silk Road in mainland Eurasia or the Maritime Silk Road. It began to wane during its final centuries from 500 AD until 1000 AD.

History 

Jade was discovered by the animist Taiwanese indigenous peoples in Taiwan and was mined soon after in 2000 BCE. During this time, migrations by Austronesians from Taiwan began southward towards the Philippines, which also resulted to some animist indigenous peoples from the Philippines to back-migrate towards Taiwan. Indigenous Filipinos soon began processing the jade from Taiwan for trade as technological advances were met. This initial trade between island communities established the first phase of the Maritime Jade Road.

With the advent of further technologies propagated by indigenous Filipinos, more styles were made to process raw jade from Taiwan. These jade crafts became sought after in many places in Southeast Asia, which led to the expansion of the network to Vietnam, Malaysia, Brunei, Singapore, Thailand, Indonesia, and Cambodia. Vietnam afterwards learned to process the Taiwanese raw jade, and added a healthy competition in the trade network. Most of the jade crafts were still manufactured and processed in the Philippines. By 500 CE, the trade network began to weaken, and by 1000 CE, the trade route's jade production formally stopped, although trade of other goods continued and expanded towards India and China. At this period, Southeast Asia became influenced by the Maritime Silk Road. Throughout its history, the Maritime Jade Road was fully independent from the Maritime Silk Road. In its productive history of 3,000 years (peaking between 2000 BCE to 500 CE), the animist-led Maritime Jade Road became known as one of the most extensive sea-based trade networks of a single geological material in the prehistoric world. It is also one of the major achievements of the animist peoples of the region. Thousands of artifacts made and traded through the Maritime Jade Road have been recovered from multiple archeological sites. The network likely waned due to later aggressions inputted by cultures outside of Southeast Asia such as India and China. Peace was essential in the continuation of the sea jade network, as seen in the case of the Philippines (the main jade manufacturing area), where the islands experienced at least 1,500 years of near absolute peace from 500 BCE to 1000 CE, coinciding with the operations of the jade network.

Places of significant jade finds

The following are the major locations of historical links with the Maritime Jade Road. Many other places aside from the following traded through the network.
Identified Fengtian and possibly Fengtian nephrites: WG. Liyushan, Wangan Islands; QM, Nangang, Qimei Islands, Penghu Archipelago; JXL, Jialulan, eastern Taiwan; LD, Yugang and Guanyindong, Ludao Islands; LY, Lanyu High School Site, Lanyu Islands; AN, Anaro, Itbayat Islands; SG, Sunget, Batan Islands; SD, Savidug, Sabtang Islands; NGS, Nagsabaran, Cagayan Valley; KD, Kay Daing, Batangas; EN, Leta-Leta and Ille Caves, El Nido, Palawan; TC, Tabon Caves, Palawan; NC, Niah Cave West Mouth, Sarawak; AB, An Bang; GM, Go Mun; DL, Dai Lanh; GMV, Go Ma Voi; BY, Binh Yen (these five sites in Quang Nam Province, central Vietnam); GCV, Giong Ca Vo, Ho Chi Minh City; SS, Samrong Sen, Cambodia; UT, U-Thong, Suphanburi; BTDP, Ban Don Ta Phet, Kanchanaburi; KSK, Khao Sam Kaeo, Chumphon.
Identified non-Fengtian nephrites: BTG, Uilang Bundok and Pila, Batangas; TK, Trang Kenh; YB, Yen Bac; MB, Man Bac; QC, Quy Chu; GB, Go Bong; XR, Xom Ren; GD, Go Dua; GL, Giong Lon

UNESCO
UNESCO published an article falsely alluding that the Maritime Jade Road is the Maritime Silk Road. The Maritime Jade Road is older than the Maritime Silk Road by more than two thousand years. The article also did not refer to the importance of Taiwan in the Maritime Jade Road. The article was under a platform operated and maintained by China (PRC), which has a political and geographical dispute with Taiwan (ROC). Taiwan has repeatedly been blocked by the Chinese government from entering or participating in the activities of UNESCO. In 2017, China initiated a call for the nomination of the Maritime Silk Road in UNESCO, while undermining the independent existence of the Maritime Jade Road and its connection to Taiwan. In 2020, Taiwanese citizens, including scientists and other scholars, were banned from UNESCO activities, amidst Chinese (PRC) pressure over UNESCO. The ban was widely criticized.

See also
 Sa Huỳnh culture - An iron age culture that emerged in South Vietnam and Philippines
 Kalanay Cave
 Austronesian peoples
 Pounamu — a type of nephrite jade used in a similar manner by New Zealand Māori

References

Jade
Cultural history of the Philippines
History of the Philippines (900–1565)
Prehistory of the Philippines
Archaeology of the Philippines
Ancient Asia
Hardstone carving
Collections of the National Museum of the Philippines